Marcus Joshua Carr (born June 6, 1999) is a Canadian college basketball player for the Texas Longhorns of the Big 12 Conference. He previously played for the Pittsburgh Panthers and the Minnesota Golden Gophers.

High school career
In his first two years of high school, Carr played for St. Michael's College School in Toronto. As a freshman, he led his team to the quarterfinals of the Ontario Federation of School Athletic Associations (OFSAA) tournament. Carr scored as many as 49 points in a single game. In 2015, he won the Ontario All-Catholic Classic and was named most valuable player (MVP) after scoring 16 points in the final. As a sophomore, Carr averaged 16 points, four rebounds and five assists per game. He lost only one game in the season, to Roman Catholic High School, and won the OFSAA title. 

Before his junior year, Carr transferred to Montverde Academy, a school in Montverde, Florida with a renowned basketball program. He was drawn to Montverde because his grandmother lived in Orlando, Florida. However, Carr missed his entire junior season with a torn ACL. As a senior, he averaged 9.1 points, 3.5 rebounds and 3.7 assists per game, playing on the same team as the top recruit in the 2018 class, RJ Barrett. His team, which was ranked among the best in the country, achieved a 26–5 record and a runners-up finish at High School Nationals. At the end of the season, he played in the BioSteel All-Canadian Game. Carr was a three-star recruit and chose to play for Pittsburgh over offers from Cincinnati, Houston and Virginia Tech, among others. He was considered a three-star recruit and was ranked the 146th best prospect in his class.

College career

Carr began his collegiate career at the University of Pittsburgh. As a true freshman, he played in all 32 of Pitt's games with 27 starts and averaged 10.0 points, 4.0 assists and 2.8 rebounds per game. Carr announced that he would be leaving the program after head coach Kevin Stallings was fired at the end of the season in which the Panthers finished a disappointing 8–24. Carr committed to transfer to the University of Minnesota.

Carr sat out one year due to NCAA transfer rules after his request for a waiver that would allow him to play immediately was denied. During the year off, he impersonated opposing guards like Carsen Edwards on the scout team. Carr scored 35 points on December 15, 2019 in a 84–71 win over third-ranked Ohio State. On January 15, 2020, Carr scored 27 points in a 75–69 win against Penn State. At the close of the regular season, Carr was named to the Third Team All-Big Ten by the  media and was Honorable Mention All-Conference according to the coaches. He averaged 15.4 points, 5.3 rebounds and 6.5 assists per game, setting a school single-season record with 207 assists. After the season, Carr declared for the 2020 NBA draft but did not sign with an agent. On August 1, he announced that he would withdraw from the draft and return to Minnesota for his junior season.

In his junior season debut on November 25, 2020, Carr recorded 35 points, seven rebounds and four assists in a 99–69 win over Green Bay. On February 27, 2021, he scored 41 points in a 78–74 loss to Nebraska. Carr earned Third Team All-Big Ten honors as a junior after averaging 19.4 points, 4.0 rebounds and 4.9 assists per game. Following the season, he transferred to Texas. Carr was named to the Third Team All-Big 12 as a senior. He returned for his final season of eligibility and surpassed the 2,000 point mark early in the season.

National team career
Carr played for Canada at the 2015 FIBA Americas Under-16 Championship in Bahía Blanca, Argentina. In four games, he averaged 6.2 points and 2.8 rebounds per game, helping his team to a silver medal finish. After recovering from a major knee injury, Carr was not invited to training camp for the 2016 FIBA Under-17 World Championship.

Career statistics

College

|-
| style="text-align:left;"| 2017–18
| style="text-align:left;"| Pittsburgh
| 32 || 27 || 28.6 || .396 || .333 || .818 || 2.8 || 4.0 || .6 || .1 || 10.0
|-
| style="text-align:left;"| 2018–19
| style="text-align:left;"| Minnesota
| style="text-align:center;" colspan="11"|  Redshirt
|-
| style="text-align:left;"| 2019–20
| style="text-align:left;"| Minnesota
| 31 || 31 || 36.8 || .393 || .361 || .700 || 5.3 || 6.5 || .9 || .1 || 15.4
|-
| style="text-align:left;"| 2020–21
| style="text-align:left;"| Minnesota
| 29 || 29 || 35.8 || .385 || .317 || .799 || 4.0 || 4.9 || 1.3 || .1 || 19.4
|-
| style="text-align:left;"| 2021–22
| style="text-align:left;"| Texas
| 34 || 32 || 30.9 || .394 || .338 || .769 || 1.9 || 3.4 || 0.9 || .1 || 11.4
|-
|- class="sortbottom"
| style="text-align:center;" colspan="2"| Career
| 126 || 119 || 32.9 || .391 || .336 || .767 || 3.5 || 4.7 || .9 || .1 || 13.9

Personal life
Carr's older brother, Duane Notice, played college basketball for South Carolina and helped the Gamecocks reach the final four round of the 2017 NCAA tournament and previously played for the Raptors 905 in the NBA G-League and the Hamilton Honeybadgers (now Brampton) in the CEBL.

References

External links
Texas Longhorns bio
Minnesota Golden Gophers bio
Pittsburgh Panthers bio

1999 births
Living people
Basketball players from Toronto
Black Canadian basketball players
Canadian expatriate basketball people in the United States
Canadian men's basketball players
Minnesota Golden Gophers men's basketball players
Montverde Academy alumni
Pittsburgh Panthers men's basketball players
Point guards
Texas Longhorns men's basketball players